All Day may refer to:

People 
Adrian Peterson (born 1985), American football player nicknamed "All Day" or "A.D."
 Allday (born 1991), Australian rapper

Music 
 All Day (Girl Talk album), 2010 album
 All Day (The Pietasters album), 2007 album by The Pietasters
 "All Day" (The Pietasters song), a 2007 song from the eponymous album
"All Day" (Kanye West song), a 2015 song by Kanye West featuring Theophilus London, Allan Kingdom and Paul McCartney
 "All Day" (Cody Simpson song), a 2011 song by Australian recording artist Cody Simpson
All Day: Nike+ Original Run, a composition written and performed by Aesop Rock
"All Day", a song by Yemi Alade from Mama Africa (Yemi Alade album)

See also